This is a list of nominated candidates for the Bloc Québécois in the 2011 Canadian federal election. The Bloc Québécois nominated candidates in all 75 Quebec ridings.

Candidates

See also
 Results of the Canadian federal election, 2008
 Results by riding for the Canadian federal election, 2008

References

External links
 Bloc Québécois website
 Elections Canada – List of Confirmed Candidates for the 41st General Election

 
 
2011-related lists